Nethercote may refer to:

 Nethercote, Banbury, Oxfordshire, England
 Nethercote, New South Wales, Australia, in Bega Valley Shire
 Nethercote, Oxfordshire, a former hamlet in Middle Aston, England
 Nethercote, Warwickshire, a location
 Nethercote, a farm in the Exmoor village Winsford, Somerset, England
 Henry Nethercote, (1819–1886) English cricketer

See also
 Newton Nethercote, a settlement in Leicestershire, England